Blerick is a railway station located in Blerick, Netherlands. The station was opened in 1868 and is located on the Venlo–Eindhoven railway and the Nijmegen–Venlo railway. The station is operated by Nederlandse Spoorwegen and Arriva. The station has four platforms.

Train services
The following train services call at this station:
Express Intercity service: (Schiphol–Utrecht–'s-Hertogenbosch–)Eindhoven–Helmond–Venlo
Local Stoptrein service: Nijmegen–Venlo–Roermond

Bus services 
 Buses departing from the station proper:
 Bus 70: Venlo Station–Blerick–Venlo Freshpark–Sevenum–Horst
 Bus 88: Venray Station–Oostrum–Wanssum–Meerlo–Tienray–Swolgen–Broekhuizenvorst–Broekhuizen–Lottum–Grubbenvorst–Blerick–Venlo
 Buses departing from Burgemeester Gommansstraat:
 City bus 1: Blerick–Venlo Station–Venlo Hospital–Tegelen–Kaldenkirchen
 City bus 2: Blerick–Venlo Station–Venlo City Centre–Venlo Stalberg
 Bus 80: Venlo Station–Blerick–Sevenum–Horst–Venray–Ysselsteyn–Deurne
 Schoolline 670: Venlo Station–Blerick–Maasbree–Helden–Panningen

External links
NS website 
Dutch public transport travel planner 

Railway stations in Venlo
Railway stations opened in 1868
Railway stations on the Maaslijn
Railway stations on the Staatslijn E